Jan Preuyt (1923 – 27 April 2006) was the South African chairman of the South African Schools Rugby Association for 25 years. He was also instrumental  in the establishment of the Craven Week rugby tournament.

Early life and education
While studying at Stellenbosch University he was noticed by his mentor and coach Danie Craven. Preuyt played for Griqualand and was a Junior Springbok in the early 1950s. Local clubs Cambridge and Buffaloes later had his services in their teams.

Career
He taught at the East London Technical College from 1956 and ended his teaching career as Deputy Principal of Port Rex Technical High School in 1987. He started rugby at the Port Rex in 1956 and coached the first team until he retired 31 years later.

He served as chairman of Border Schools and South Africa Schools Rugby Association for 25 years. In 1974 and 1983 he was manager of the South Africa Schools Teams which toured Italy, France and Wales respectively. In later years he organised other codes of sport, and in 1986 he was the first president of the South Africa Schools Union (all codes).

References

1923 births
2006 deaths
South African schoolteachers
South African rugby union coaches
South African rugby union players